Ferdinand August Kauer (18 January 1751 – 13 April 1831) was an Austrian composer and pianist.

Biography
Kauer was born in Klein-Thaya (today Dyjákovičky) near Znojmo in South Moravia). He studied in Znojmo, Tyrnau, and Vienna, and later settled in Vienna around 1777. In 1781 he joined Karl von Marinelli's newly formed company at Vienna as leader and conductor of the orchestra. From 1782 he also composed music for the theatre, including Singspiele, operas, and incidental music and songs, mostly to texts by the house poet Karl Friedrich Hensler. Their first major success was Das Faustrecht in Thüringen (The Law of the Jungle in Thüringen, 1796–1797), which was eclipsed two years later by the success of Das Donauweibchen (1798).

He was Kapellmeister of the Theater in der Leopoldstadt and Theater in der Josefstadt in Vienna and also in Graz. He directed the Leopoldstadt Theater Music School and by the 1790s had become known for his popular Singspiele. In addition to his successful stage works he composed several tutorial methods for violin, flute, piano and singing (c. 1790). A tragic flood in 1830 destroyed all Kauer's possessions, including most of his scores. He continued to work as the second viola player at the Theater in der Leopoldstadt orchestra until his death in Vienna a year later.

Legacy
He wrote about 200 operas and Singspiele. The romantic opera Das Donauweibchen (1798) was one of the most popular operas of the early 19th century. It was staged in Russia in 1803–1807 as Lesta, dneprovskaya rusalka and its three sequels with Russian text and additional music by the naturalised Russian immigrant Catterino Cavos who originally hailed from Venice, and Stepan Davydov (1777–1825).

Das Donauweibchen was the first opera staged in Finland on 3 December 1826 in Viipuri by Schultz’s company. It was not unusual for travelling companies to make an excursion from the nearby Saint Petersburg to Viipuri, Finland being an autonomous Grand Duchy in the Russian Empire at the time.

Kauer also wrote 200 masses, many pieces of chamber music, incidental music (including Das Faustrecht in Thüringen). His "12 Neue Ungarische Tänze" reflect the influence of roaming Gypsy orchestras upon many composers of this era. In his "Sei variazioni" (c. 1810) Kauer introduced the xylophone into western classical music, and from that time this instrument has been adopted as a regular element of the orchestra. His music is rarely performed in modern times, but has been shown to be highly imaginative, tuneful, and worthy of further study.

Selected works

Ferdinand Kauer’s keyboard "Sonata militaire" was mistakenly attributed to Joseph Haydn as Sonata D major, Hob. XVI: D1.

Bibliography
Kauer, Ferdinand. Kurzgefasste Generalbass-Schule für Anfänger. Wien, J. Cappi. c. 1800
Kauer, Ferdinand. Kurzgefasste Harmonieschule für Damen mit Tonsystem, worin das H ausgeschlossen wird. c. 1800
Manschinger K.: Ferdinand Kauer, doctoral thesis, Vienna 1929
Bauer, A.: Das Theater in der Josefstadt, 1957
Longyear, R. M.: Ferdinand Kauer's Percussion Enterprises, Galpin Society Journal, vol. 27 (1974), 2–8.

External links
Italian Opera Articles: Kauer
Lorelea (Russian)
Operone
List of stage works at the Opern Project of the University of Cologne

1751 births
1831 deaths
Austrian classical composers
Austrian male classical composers
Austrian opera composers
Austrian people of Moravian-German descent
Male opera composers
Moravian-German people
People from the Margraviate of Moravia
People from Znojmo District